Thomas Murray Buchan  (September 1889 – 1952) was an English professional footballer. A left half who was also capable of playing as a right half or inside right, he played for nine clubs in his career. He was the older brother of Charlie Buchan.

Career
Buchan began his career with non-League clubs Woodhall Thistle and Northfleet United. In 1911 he signed for Leyton and then Sunderland, but did not make any Football League appearances for the Black Cats.

He signed for Blackpool in 1913. He made 24 League appearances for the Seasiders, scoring two goals. In 1914 he joined nearby Bolton Wanderers, for whom he made 116 League appearances and scored fourteen goals in eight years.

He spent a season with Tranmere Rovers in 1923–24, before finishing his career with Runcorn and Atherton.

References

1889 births
1952 deaths
Footballers from Plumstead
English footballers
Association football wing halves
Sunderland A.F.C. players
Leyton F.C. players
Sunderland Rovers F.C. players
Blackpool F.C. players
Bolton Wanderers F.C. players
Tranmere Rovers F.C. players
Runcorn F.C. Halton players
Atherton Collieries A.F.C. players
English Football League players